Iglica kleinzellensis is a species of very small or minute freshwater snail with an operculum, an aquatic gastropod mollusk in the family Hydrobiidae. This species is endemic to Austria.

References

Iglica (gastropod)
Endemic fauna of Austria
Gastropods described in 1981
Taxonomy articles created by Polbot